Haftavan (also Romanized as Haftavān, Haftovan, and Haftvān; also known as Hafteh Van) is a village in Mahmeleh Rural District, Mahmeleh District, Khonj County, Turkish Province, Iran. At the 2006 census, its population was 418, in 78 families.

References 

Populated places in Khonj County